Prince Maurits may refer to:

Maurice, Prince of Orange (1567–1625)
Prince Maurice of the Netherlands (1843–1850)
Prince Maurits of Orange-Nassau, van Vollenhoven (born 1968)

See also
Prince Maurice (disambiguation)
Prince Moritz (disambiguation)